St Philip's railway station was a small terminus station in Bristol built by the Midland Railway to relieve pressure on the main station at Bristol Temple Meads, which it shared with the Great Western Railway. The station had a single platform and was used principally by the local services between Bristol and Bath Green Park, via Mangotsfield.

St Philip's was created by the Midland in part of its extensive goods yard in Bristol and opened in 1870, the company having opened the line from Mangotsfield into Bath the previous year. The station was sited close to the Old Market shopping area and also attracted commuter traffic.

The Old Market area was badly bombed during World War II, and Bristol's shopping district was rebuilt elsewhere. St Philips Goods Station was renamed Midland Road on 15 September 1952. The local passenger trains were rerouted into Temple Meads and the passenger station closed on 21 September 1953. Midland Road goods station closed on 1 April 1967.

Since closure the station was demolished and its site was redeveloped for light industrial units.

Services

References
 Bristol Railway Stations 1840-2005 by Mike Oakley, Redcliffe Press, Bristol, 2006, 

Former Midland Railway stations
Disused railway stations in Bristol
Railway stations in Great Britain opened in 1870
Railway stations in Great Britain closed in 1953